Prototreta flabellata is one of several species of brachiopod that occur in the Cambrian rocks of central and southern Montana, Nixon Gulch section, Three Forks Quad. It is associated with the trilobite genus Ehmania near the base of the Middle Cambrian Meagher limestone.

References 

Cambrian brachiopods of North America

Cambrian genus extinctions